Covers is a compilation album of covers by British alternative rock band Placebo. The album was originally released as a bonus disc with the special edition version of Sleeping with Ghosts on 22 September 2003 through Hut Records and Astralwerks, which has since gone out of print. "Running Up that Hill" is mostly responsible for this digital release package. After being used for the fourth-season premiere of The O.C., the song received much attention in both the U.S. and the UK, peaking at No. 44 on the UK Singles Chart.

Release 

A vinyl LP version of the album was issued in 2003 with an all-gray cover and only the white name of the band on it (the 2010 LP reissue of the album has a red title). Most of the songs on the album were originally B-sides from the band's previous singles.

A repackaged physical version of the album was re-released on 3 May 2010 through Placebo's former label, EMI, with a new cover based on the Sleeping with Ghosts theme. However, this was strictly EMI's decision and didn't have any input from the band in releasing the album.

Track listing

References 

Placebo (band) albums
2003 albums
Covers albums